Dood Water  is a 1934 Dutch drama film directed by Gerard Rutten.

Cast
Jan Musch	... 	Willem de Geus
Theo de Maal	... 	Jaap de Meeuw (as Teo de Maal)
Betsy Ranucci-Beckman	... 	Aaf de Meeuw
Arnold Marlé... 	Dirk Brak
Max Croiset	... 	Jan Brak
Helga Gogh	... 	Maartje Brak
Johan Schilthuyzen		
Jules Verstraete

Reception
Writing for The Spectator, Graham Greene praised the film's documentary prologue as "an exciting piece of pure cinema", and commented that the story which follows "has some of the magnificent drive one felt behind the classic Russian films, behind Earth and The General Line: no tiresome 'message', but a belief in the importance of a human activity truthfully reported". Greene also noted, however, that "the photography is uneven: at moments it is painfully 'arty', deliberately out of focus".

References

External links 
 

1934 films
Dutch black-and-white films
1934 drama films
Films directed by Gerard Rutten
Dutch drama films
1930s Dutch-language films